The Zephyrometer is a public sculpture by Phil Price in Evans Bay, Wellington. The work was installed in 2003. It is a kinetic sculpture consisting of a concrete cylinder holding a 26m tall needle which sways to show wind direction and speed. It is sited on Cobham Drive to make use of Wellington's wind.  The Zephyrometer was damaged by lightning on August 14, 2014.

Zephyrometer was the second of five major wind sculptures commissioned by the Wellington Sculpture Trust over the period 2000 – 2010, which now make up the Meridian Wind Sculpture Walk. The work has attracted international interest, and is a beloved local landmark.

Lightning strike
On 14 August 2014 at approximately 2:30pm, the Zephyrometer was struck by lightning during a hail storm, leaving the tip of the sculpture frayed. A spokesman for Wellington City Council confirmed that the "needle" is "completely stuffed". Video of the actual lightning strike itself was captured by Solomon Emet and is viewable on YouTube . The sculpture was restored on May 13, 2015,  but the new needle was composed of a lighter material which caused the sculpture to bend very low in extremely windy conditions.  Additional weight had to be added to the counterbalance.

See also
Wind Wand
 Halo (artwork)

References

External links
Zephyrometer official page from the Wellington Sculpture Trust
Zephyrometer pictures at Flickr
Lightning Strikes Wellington Zephyrometer – video of the 2014 lightning strike captured by Solomon Emet on YouTube.

Outdoor sculptures in New Zealand
Buildings and structures in Wellington City
Fiberglass sculptures
2003 sculptures
Kinetic sculptures